The Battle of Méribel took place at Méribel (now in Savoie, France) on 13 September 1793, when the forces of the Kingdom of Sardinia were defeated by the French Army.

In 1792, Revolutionary French forces had marched into Savoy to "bring freedom" to its people as part of the French Revolution. A decree annexing it to France was signed on 27 November of the same year, and it became the 85th département of France, renamed as the Mont Blanc département.

Following the execution of King Louis XVI, the French Revolution became widely despised and feared elsewhere in Europe. In 1793, the French Republic raised an army of 300,000 men, while only few Savoyards signed up for service. A much larger force of Savoyards, conducted by the Royalist camp attacked the French Army, and reconquered the Alpine valleys and Annecy. However, they were not enough to remove the French presence from Savoy and the territory was retaken.

References

1793 in France
Méribel
Meribel 1793
Meribel 1793
Méribel